The Little Danube (Slovak: Malý Dunaj, Hungarian: Kis-Duna, German: Kleine Donau) is a branch of the river Danube in Slovakia.

It splits from the main river near Bratislava, and flows more or less parallel to the Danube until it flows into the river Váh in Kolárovo.

The part of the Váh between Kolárovo and its confluence with the Danube in Komárno is also called Váh Danube (Slovak: Vážsky Dunaj, Hungarian: Vág-Duna). The island between the Danube, the Little Danube and the Váh Danube rivers is Žitný ostrov.

References

Rivers of Slovakia
0Little Danube
Distributaries of Europe